Abdul Hussayn Jivaji (also known as Malak) was the founder of the Atba-i-Malak branch of Mustaali Ismaili Shi'a Islam.

References 

Ismailis
Musta'li Isma'ilism